Jesús Rosendo Prado (born 16 March 1982 in Seville) is a Spanish professional road bicycle racer for UCI Professional Continental team . He has not yet won any races, but was the first leader of the King of the Mountains classification of the 2008 Vuelta a España, as the race began in his home province of Andalusia.

On 4 May 2010 Prado's name was released as being one of several riders under investigation by the UCI for "irregular blood values". The rider was suspended by his team  who released a statement saying that the haemoglobin and haematocrit levels appeared low, due to anaemia as a result of bleeding that the rider had suffered in April 2009 due to haemorrhoids. In 2011 due to a strong ride in a breakaway in Stage 2 of the Vuelta Rosendo wore the white jersey for best combined rider for one day after losing it to Pablo Lastras.

Palmarès
2008 – 
 Leader Mountain Classification after stages 2,3,4,5 and 6, Vuelta a España
2011 – 
Wore White Jersey best Combined rider in Stage 3 of the Vuelta

References

External links 

Spanish male cyclists
1982 births
Living people
Sportspeople from Seville
Cyclists from Andalusia